"Alice e il blu" is a song by Italian singer Annalisa. It was released by Warner Music Italy on 12 April 2013 as the second single of her second studio album Non so ballare. The song peaked at number 79 on the FIMI Singles Chart.

Music video
A music video to accompany the release of "Alice e il blu" premiered on 10 May 2013 on the website of newspaper La Repubblica and was released onto YouTube on 15 May 2015. It was directed by Gaetano Morbioli and shot in Verona.

Track listing

Charts

References

2013 singles
2013 songs
Annalisa songs
Songs written by Dario Faini